Noor Pur 122 JB (Urdu نورپور) was a village on Millat Road, Faisalabad. Now it part of the city of Faisalabad. 122 JB Gokhowal was on the north side.
There is big Fruit and vegetable market in main bazaar of Noor pur People of Millat road mostly do shopping from Noorpur Bazaar.

Main Residential Colonies
in the area of Noor Pur there are many residential colonies.
Green Town
Usman Town
Muslim Town

References

Punjab, Pakistan
Faisalabad District